Star Awards 1998 is the 5th edition of the annual Star Awards presented by the Television Corporation of Singapore to honour its artistes who work on Channel 8. The Best Comedy Performer and Best Variety Show Host Awards were introduced to recognise excellence in non-drama categories such as sitcoms, comedy shows and variety/infotainment shows.

Winners and nominees
Winners are listed first, highlighted in boldface. Other nominees are arranged based on chronological order of actors' showcase videos on the ceremony itself
Best Actor (最佳男主角)
Xie Shaoguang 谢韶光 - Stand by Me 家人有约
Christopher Lee 李铭顺 - The Return of the Condor Heroes 神雕侠侣
Li Nanxing 李南星 - The New Adventures of Wisely 卫斯理传奇
Chew Chor Meng 周初明 - Immortal Love 不老传说
Terence Cao 曹国辉 - Stand by Me 家人有约

Best Actress 最佳女主角
Huang Biren 黄碧仁 - Stand by Me 家人有约 
Zheng Wanling 郑琬龄 - Driven by a Car 欲望街车
Zoe Tay 郑惠玉 - The New Adventures of Wisely 卫斯理传奇
Fann Wong 范文芳 - The Return of the Condor Heroes 神雕侠侣
Lina Ng 黄嫊方 - Living in Geylang 芽笼芽笼

Best Supporting Actor 最佳男配角
Chen Guohua 陈国华 - Around People's Park 珍珠街坊 
Richard Low 刘谦益 - Living in Geylang 芽笼芽笼
Lin Yisheng 林益盛 - The New Adventures of Wisely 卫斯理传奇
Zheng Geping 郑各评 - The Return of the Condor Heroes 神雕侠侣
Chunyu Shanshan 淳于珊珊 - Rising Expectations 长河

Best Supporting Actress 最佳女配角
Xiang Yun 向云 - Around People's Park 珍珠街坊
Chen Huihui 陈慧慧 - The Guest People 客家之歌
Hong Huifang 洪慧芳 - Facing the Music 钢琴88
Kym Ng 鐘琴 - The New Adventures of Wisely 卫斯理传奇
Yvonne Lim 林湘萍 - The Return of the Condor Heroes 神雕侠侣

Best Drama Serial 最佳电视剧
Stand by Me 家人有约
Immortal Love 不老传说
Driven by a Car 欲望街车
The Return of the Condor Heroes 神雕侠侣
The New Adventures of Wisely 卫斯理传奇
Best Variety Show Host 最佳综艺主持人
Kym Ng 鐘琴 - City Beat 城人杂志
Guo Liang 郭亮 - 异度空间
Sharon Au 欧菁仙 - 群星照亮千万心之新视艺人齐献力
Bryan Wong 王禄江 - City Beat 城人杂志
Wang Yanqing 王嬿青 - 嬿青有约

Best Comedy Performer 最佳喜剧演员
Mark Lee 李国煌 - Comedy Nite 搞笑行动
Jack Neo 梁智强 - Comedy Nite 搞笑行动
Huang Wenyong 黄文永 - Don't Worry, Be Happy 敢敢做个开心人 III
Chew Chor Meng 周初明 - Don't Worry, Be Happy 敢敢做个开心人 III
Tracer Wong 王裕香 - Don't Worry, Be Happy 敢敢做个开心人 III

Best Variety Show 最佳综艺节目
Comedy Nite 搞笑行动

Special Awards 
Special Achievement Award 红星大奖特别成就奖
Zoe Tay 郑惠玉

Popularity Awards 
Most Popular Newcomer 最受欢迎新人
Evelyn Tan 陈毓芸 - A Place to Call Home 薯条汉堡青春豆
Amanda Ho 何芸珊 - Starting Point 青春列车
Florence Tan 陈秀丽 - Immortal Love 不老传说
Joey Swee 徐绮 - The Test Of Time 三年零八个月
Michelle Liu 刘铃铃 - Starting Point 青春列车
Yvonne Lim 林湘萍 - Starting Point 青春列车
Andi Lim 林伟文 - Starting Point 青春列车
Huang Feixiang 黄飞翔 - The Test Of Time 三年零八个月
Henry Chong 钟应时 - Starting Point 青春列车
Jerry Chang 常鲁峰 - The New Adventures of Wisely 卫斯理传奇
Huang Guoliang 黄国良 - Starting Point 青春列车
Tay Ping Hui 郑斌辉 - On the Edge - Mr Personality 风度翩翩先生
Vincent Ng 翁清海 - Sword & Honour 铁血男儿
Sean Tang 陈思恩 - A Place to Call Home 薯条汉堡青春豆
Top 10 Most Popular Male Artistes 十大最受欢迎男艺人

Top 10 Most Popular Female Artistes 十大最受欢迎女艺人

Taiwan polls 
Most Popular Drama in Taiwan
The Return of the Condor Heroes 神雕侠侣

Most Popular Female Artiste in Taiwan
Fann Wong 范文芳

Most Popular Male Artiste in Taiwan
Christopher Lee 李铭顺

Reference

External links
Star Awards Hall of Fame

Star Awards